The 2010 Iowa Hawkeyes football team represented the University of Iowa in the 2010 NCAA Division I FBS football season.  The Hawkeyes, led by 12th year head coach Kirk Ferentz, were members of the Big Ten Conference and played their home games at Kinnick Stadium in Iowa City, Iowa.

The Hawkeyes finished the regular season 7–5 (4–4 Big Ten) and earned a trip to the Insight Bowl, where they faced the Missouri Tigers. The Hawkeyes won the game 27–24 and finished the season 8–5.

Preseason
Iowa came off of an 11–2 season in 2009, in which they finished with a victory over Georgia Tech in the 2010 Orange Bowl and a final ranking of No. 7 in both major polls. Many players from the previous season returned, including Ricky Stanzi, Derrell Johnson-Koulianos, Marvin McNutt, Adrian Clayborn and Tyler Sash, which led to high expectations among Hawkeye fans. Iowa entered the season ranked 9th in the AP Poll and 10th in the Coaches' Poll.

Schedule

Rankings

Roster

Game summaries

Eastern Illinois

Source: Box score

Running back Adam Robinson carried the ball 24 times for 109 yards and 3 touchdowns, while Stanzi, the quarterback, threw for 229 yards and one touchdown as the Hawkeyes won with relative ease. Also scoring for Iowa was Paki O'Meara, who blocked an Eastern Illinois punt and returned it 42 yards. Trailing 21–0, Eastern Illinois' only points came on a second-quarter drive that included a fake punt and an 11-yard touchdown pass from Brandon Large to Von Wise. On the next possession, Stanzi took a tumble onto the turf and limped off to the sidelines, creating concern among the sellout crowd, but Robinson and backup James Vandenberg would lead them down the field for another score. Stanzi would later return.

Iowa State

Source: Box score

From the get-go, the Hawkeyes were in control of the game, receiving the opening kickoff and scoring seven minutes later on a 9-yard Marvin McNutt pass from Ricky Stanzi. Iowa State would see the ball for just 1:26 in the first quarter, going three and out on their only drive, giving it back to Iowa, who would increase its lead to 14–0 on the next possession, which lasted into the early second quarter. In all, Iowa possessed the ball for over 35 minutes, passing for 275 yards and rushing for another 204 along the way.

The Cyclones, meanwhile, endured a replica of the poor performance they put forward against Iowa in 2009, being limited to 179 yards in three quarters. Quarterback Austen Arnaud, who threw for four interceptions in that game, was picked off three more times this year. However, after going 17 quarters without scoring an offensive touchdown against Iowa, ISU finally found the end zone with 1:46 remaining in the game, on an 8-yard touchdown pass from Arnaud to Darius Darks.

at No. 24 Arizona

Source: Box Score

After allowing long interception and kickoff returns for touchdowns, the #9 Hawkeyes found themselves down by 20 at halftime. Despite the sizable deficit on the road, Iowa mounted a comeback with a strong second half. Ricky Stanzi tossed a third quarter touchdown to Derrell Johnson-Koulianos, and another in the fourth to Marvin McNutt to bring the Hawkeyes to within six at 27–21. Moments later, defensive end Broderick Binns snatched a Nick Foles pass out of the air and returned it 20 yards for the tying touchdown. The extra point was blocked, denying the Hawkeyes their first lead of the game. On the ensuing possession, Foles led the Wildcats on a 9-play, 72-yard drive capped with a 4-yard touchdown pass on third and goal. Stanzi was sacked three times on Iowa's next possession, effectively ending the game. Arizona would go on to start 7–1 before dropping their final five games of the season to finish 7–6.

Ball State

Source: Box score

The Hawkeyes came off the tough loss at Arizona by dominating Ball State, outgaining the Cardinals 562–112 in total yards. Ricky Stanzi threw for 288 yards and 3 touchdowns, with two of those scores being hauled in by Derrell Johnson-Koulianos (4 total receptions for 87 yards). Adam Robinson had 115 yards rushing and 2 touchdowns.

No. 22 Penn State

Source: ESPN

Iowa opened up Big Ten play in dominating fashion, holding a ranked Penn State team to 54 yards rushing en route to its largest margin of victory over the Nittany Lions, 24–3. It was the Hawkeyes' eighth win in nine games against Penn State.

at Michigan

Source: Box score

After twice holding a 21-point lead in Ann Arbor (28–7 end of 3rd quarter, 35–14 early in the 4th quarter), Iowa held on to win its Big Ten road opener, 38–28. Adam Robinson rushed for 143 yards and 2 touchdowns, and Derrell Johnson-Koulianos hauled in 3 touchdown receptions. After this win, the Hawkeyes had won 20 of 23 games dating back to the 2008 season.

No. 10 Wisconsin

Source: Box score 

The two teams traded scores until the Hawkeyes kicked a field goal with 8:35 remaining to go up 30–24. Iowa forced the Badgers into a punting situation on their next possession, but were not prepared for a fake on 4th down and 4 from Wisconsin's own 26. Badger punter Brad Nortman ran for 17 yards on the play, and Wisconsin methodically marched down the field for the go-ahead score. The Hawkeyes also had an extra point blocked after their first touchdown, and the two special teams miscues proved costly. The victory catapulted Wisconsin toward a share of the Big Ten title and the Rose Bowl, as they won their final four regular season games by an average of 37.8 points.

No. 5 Michigan State

Source: Box score

The Hawkeyes dismantled previously unbeaten, fifth-ranked Michigan State. After leading 30–0 at halftime, Iowa opened up a 37–0 advantage before the Spartans scored their only points of the game in the fourth quarter. This effort was a showcase of what could have been in 2010 for Iowa.

at Indiana

Source: Box Score

at Northwestern

Source: Box Score

After the Wildcats scored a touchdown midway through the first quarter, Iowa rattled off the next 17 points and led by 10 entering the 4th quarter. The Hawkeyes were threatening again when Stanzi was picked off near the end zone. That play changed momentum and Northwestern scored touchdowns after 85- and 91-yard drives. Wildcat quarterback Dan Persa ruptured his Achilles' tendon after throwing the winning touchdown. This marked the fifth win over Iowa in six tries for Northwestern, building off their stunning victory over the 9–0 #4-ranked Hawkeyes in Kinnick Stadium the prior year.

No. 8 Ohio State

Source: Box score

With Iowa leading 17–13 late in the fourth quarter, Buckeye quarterback Terrelle Pryor scrambled for 14 yards on 4th and 10. Four plays later, Dan Herron scored from a yard out giving Ohio State the lead for good. The loss was the Hawkeyes' third in five weeks where Iowa gave up the game-winning score inside the final two minutes of the game.

In July 2011 Ohio State vacated all of their 2010 victories in response to the NCAA infractions committed by five players, which Coach Jim Tressel had covered up at the time.  This included their victory against the Hawkeyes.

at Minnesota

Source: Box Score

In Iowa's first trip to TCF Bank Stadium, Minnesota – 2–9 entering the game – handed the Hawkeyes their third straight loss to end the regular season. The loss also dropped Iowa out of the Top 25 rankings for the first time since Week 3 of the 2009 season.

vs. No. 14 Missouri (Insight Bowl)

Source: Box Score

Despite the disappointing season, Iowa mopped up Missouri, the third place Big 12 Conference team, 27–24 to end the season on a high note. Freshman Marcus Coker ran for an Iowa bowl game record 219 yards and scored two touchdowns. Micah Hyde’s 72-yard interception return in the fourth quarter was the go-ahead score.

It was the first meeting between the schools in 100 years.

All-Conference honors

All-America honors
Adrian Clayborn: Consensus First-Team All-American

Players in the 2011 NFL Draft

References

Iowa
Guaranteed Rate Bowl champion seasons
Iowa Hawkeyes football seasons
Iowa Hawkeyes football